Claudio Martín Pombo (born 28 April 1994) is an Argentine professional footballer who plays as a midfielder for Instituto.

Career
Pombo started out in River Plate's youth. He completed a move to Juventud Unida in 2013, appearing for the club in the 2013–14 Torneo Argentino A. The club were promoted in his second campaign to Primera B Nacional, by which point he had featured fourteen times for them. He remained for one further season, which preceded his departure in 2016 when he signed for Huracán of Torneo Federal B. After six goals in twelve fixtures for Huracán, Pombo left and subsequently had trials with Independiente and Platense; either side of one with Salvadoran Primera División side Águila. All three sides decided against signing Pombo.

Juventud Unida resigned Pombo ahead of the 2016–17 Primera B Nacional campaign. Two years following, after five goals in thirty-nine appearances in all competitions, Pombo made a move to Atlético Tucumán of the Argentine Primera División.

Career statistics
.

References

External links

1994 births
Living people
Sportspeople from Entre Ríos Province
Argentine footballers
Association football midfielders
Torneo Argentino A players
Torneo Federal A players
Primera Nacional players
Argentine Primera División players
Juventud Unida de Gualeguaychú players
Atlético Tucumán footballers
Club Atlético Sarmiento footballers
Instituto footballers